The Zhongxing Pagoda is a pagoda in Chengcing Lake, Niaosong District, Kaohsiung, Taiwan.

Architecture
The pagoda stands at a height of 43 meters over 7 floors. It is surrounded by various plants and flowers.

See also
 Religion in Taiwan

References

Buildings and structures in Kaohsiung
Pagodas in Taiwan